Panna is a genus of fish in the family Sciaenidae.

Species
There are currently 3 recognized species in this genus:
 Panna heterolepis Trewavas, 1977 (Hooghly croaker)
 Panna microdon (Bleeker, 1849) (Panna croaker)
 Panna perarmatus (Chabanaud, 1926) (Armour croaker)

References

Sciaenidae